Roberto Rivera Díaz (born January 1, 1969) is a former Major League Baseball player.

References

External links

1969 births
Living people
Canton-Akron Indians players
Chicago Cubs players
Major League Baseball pitchers
Major League Baseball players from Puerto Rico
San Diego Padres players
Kinston Indians players
Sportspeople from Bayamón, Puerto Rico